The Emma Gaala is a Finnish music gala arranged yearly by Musiikkituottajat – IFPI Finland, awarding the Emma Awards to the most distinguished artists and music professionals of the year. It has been arranged annually since 1983, except between 1988 and 1990.

Until 1991, the winners were selected by representatives of ÄKT. From 1992 onward they have only selected the candidates, from which a board of music critics has selected the winners. The selection criteria include interesting musical merit, musical and commercial success in the recording industry, and the artist's popularity measured in different ways.

References

External links
Emma-gaala (in Finnish)

Finnish music awards